Tiri  Gjoci (born 5 November 1993, in Kavajë) is an Albanian musician singing various genres in Pop, Alternative, Blues, Pop-Rock, Dance-Hall etc. His musical career began at age 14. Tiri was introduced to the public when he was featured in the Dr Flori 2013 hit "Zemërthyer". Tiri later took part in various music competitions. He was in a group called Bob Bob Band that won "Best Group" at the TV contest Kënga Magjike  in 2014. He became winner of season 5 of The Voice of Albania  in 2016.

In December 2018, Tiri released the rock-ballad "Adriane"  and on 8 May 2019 he published the hit "Zemer", followed on 8 July 2019 by the single "Kujtimet".

References

External links
Tiri YouTube channel

1993 births
Living people
21st-century Albanian male singers
Singers from Kavajë
Festivali i Këngës contestants